Muksamse'lapli, also known as White Cindy, was a healer who lived near the Klamath people on a small ranch on the shore of Agency Lake, in Oregon. Muksamse'lapli was assigned male at birth, but is referred to in most contemporary accounts as a woman or transvestite, and referred to themself as "half she and half he".

Muksamse'lapli's knowledge of healing and botany were respected and sought after by both Klamath and non-Native botanists seeking knowledge of local plants.  

Muksamse'lapli was arrested and jailed for violent altercations with Klamath people on the reservation, though in some of these cases the plea was self-defense.

Muksamse'lapli was married twice.

References

People from Klamath County, Oregon
Year of death missing
Year of birth missing
Two-spirit people